{{DISPLAYTITLE:C14H14N2}}
The molecular formula C14H14N2 (molar mass: 210.27 g/mol, exact mass: 210.1157 u) may refer to:

 3-Amino-9-ethylcarbazole (AEC)
 Naphazoline